Newtown Bay is a bay on the northwestern coast of the Isle of Wight, England in the western arm of the Solent. It is a subtle bay located around the exit of the Newtown River. It stretches about 4 km from Hamstead Point in the west to Salt Mead Ledge to the east. It is a remote place as there are few properties along this part of the coast, it being low-lying marshland and home to countless sea birds, and is often visited by walkers, boaters, birdwatchers and beachcombers. The shore is a narrow band of gravel, while the sea bottom is mostly mud or sand.

To the east of the river entrance, sticking out into the bay, is a sand spit and further east another sailing hazard called Salt Mead Ledge both of these are only uncovered at low water. From here to Great Thorness to the east and Porchfield to the south, the land is used by the military and is marked on maps as a Danger Area. For this reason the Isle of Wight coastal path skirts this area.

A small peninsula into the bay holds Corf county campsite, itself an SSSI.

The National Trust owns much of the land and landing at Fishhouse point is not allowed.

External links
 Images of Newtown River entrance and Salt Mead Ledges

Bays of the Isle of Wight